Callaghan is an Unincorporated community and census-designated place (CDP) in Alleghany County, Virginia, United States. The population as of the 2010 Census was 348.

Humpback Covered Bridge and Wood Hall are listed on the U.S. National Register of Historic Places.

References

External links
Virginia Trend Report 2: State and Complete Places (Sub-state 2010 Census Data)

Unincorporated communities in Virginia
Unincorporated communities in Alleghany County, Virginia
Census-designated places in Alleghany County, Virginia
Census-designated places in Virginia